WO or Wo may refer to:

Arts and entertainment
 Wo Fat, a fictional nemesis of Steve McGarrett on the television show Hawaii 5-0
 Zhang Wo, a Chinese painter of the Yuan Dynasty

Languages
 Wo (kana), a Japanese kana
 Wolof language (ISO 639-1 code "wo")

People
 Zhang Wo, a Chinese painter of the Yuan Dynasty
 Wo Ding, traditionally believed to be a king of the Shang Dynasty
 Wo Jia, a king of the Shang Dynasty
 Wo Weihan (1949–2008), a Chinese scientist and entrepreneur executed for allegedly spying for Taiwan

Other uses
 W. O. Bentley, a British car designer
 Warrant Officer, a rank in many military services
 Wine of Origin, a designated area for the production of South African wine
 World Airways (IATA code WO)
 Walk-off (disambiguation)
 Walk over, a term in sports and elections
 Wo' or Uo, one of the 18 months of the Haab', a part of the Maya calendric system

See also 
 OW (disambiguation)